"Animal Instinct" is a song by Irish rock band the Cranberries. It was released as the second single from the band's fourth album, Bury the Hatchet, in June 1999. The single became the band's first single to miss the UK top 40 (excluding the original chart position of "Linger"), charting at number 54. A music video, directed by Olivier Dahan, was released to promote the single. In 2017, the song was released as an acoustic, stripped down version on the band's Something Else album.

Track listings
CD single 1 (UK)
 "Animal Instinct" – 3:31
 "Paparazzi on Mopeds" – 4:32
 "Ode to My Family" (live, Hamburg '99) – 4:30

CD single 2 (UK)
 "Animal Instinct" – 3:31
 "Baby Blues" – 2:38
 "Salvation" (live, Hamburg '99) – 2:38

Maxi-single
 "Animal Instinct" – 3:31
 "Paparazzi on Mopeds" – 4:32
 "Ode to My Family" (live, Hamburg '99) – 4:30
 "Salvation" (live, Hamburg '99) – 2:38

French limited-edition CD single
 "Animal Instinct" – 3:31
 "Dreams" (live, Oslo '99) – 4:12
 "Linger" (live, Oslo '99) – 4:40
 "Zombie" (live, Tipperary '94) – 5:21

Charts

Release history

References

1999 singles
1999 songs
The Cranberries songs
Island Records singles
Mercury Records singles
Music videos directed by Olivier Dahan
Songs written by Dolores O'Riordan
Songs written by Noel Hogan